Datu Unsay, officially the Municipality of Datu Unsay (Maguindanaon: Ingud nu Datu Unsay; Iranun: Inged a Datu Unsay), is a 5th class municipality in the province of Maguindanao del Sur, Philippines. According to the 2020 census, it has a population of 12,890 people.

History
Datu Unsay was created under Muslim Mindanao Autonomy Act No. 150 on July 1, 2003, carved out of the municipality of Shariff Aguak. The town is named after its former mayor Andal "Datu Unsay" Ampatuan, Jr.

On July 30, 2009, upon the ratification of Muslim Mindanao Autonomy Acts No. 225 (as amended by MMAA 252) and MMAA 220, the municipalities of Shariff Saydona Mustapha and Datu Hoffer Ampatuan, respectively, were created from a total of 2 entire barangays and portions of 2 barangays from Datu Unsay, in addition to other barangays from Datu Piang, Datu Saudi-Ampatuan, Mamasapano and Shariff Aguak.

Geography

Barangays
Datu Unsay is politically subdivided into 8 barangays.
Bulayan
Iganagampong
Macalag 
Maitumaig
Malangog
Meta
Panangeti
Tuntungan

Climate

Demographics

Economy

References

External links
Datu Unsay Profile at the DTI Cities and Municipalities Competitive Index
MMA Act No. 150 : An Act Creating the Municipality of Datu Unsay in the Province of Maguindanao
[ Philippine Standard Geographic Code]
Local Governance Performance Management System

Municipalities of Maguindanao del Sur